Bruce George Cameron  (born 1941/42) is a former weightlifter for New Zealand. He won two bronze medals at British Commonwealth Games representing New Zealand.

Cameron's early sporting career was as a rugby union player, touring Australia with the Junior All Blacks in 1964, but he later took up weightlifting due to injury.

Cameron competed in the 60 kg division in weightlifting at the 1966 British Empire and Commonwealth Games, finishing eighth. He won the bronze medal at the 1970 British Commonwealth Games in the men's 67.5 kg grade. Then four years later at the 1974 British Commonwealth Games he won the bronze medal in the same grade.

He was a New Zealand Olympic team selector from 1977 to 2005.

In 1990, Cameron was awarded the New Zealand 1990 Commemoration Medal. In the 2006 New Year Honours, he was appointed an Officer of the New Zealand Order of Merit, for services to sport.

References

1940s births
Living people
New Zealand rugby union players
New Zealand male weightlifters
Commonwealth Games bronze medallists for New Zealand
Weightlifters at the 1966 British Empire and Commonwealth Games
Weightlifters at the 1970 British Commonwealth Games
Weightlifters at the 1974 British Commonwealth Games
New Zealand referees and umpires
Officers of the New Zealand Order of Merit
Commonwealth Games medallists in weightlifting
20th-century New Zealand people
21st-century New Zealand people
Medallists at the 1970 British Commonwealth Games
Medallists at the 1974 British Commonwealth Games